Caloglyphus is a genus of mites in the family Acaridae.

Species
 Caloglyphus argillaceus Sevastianov & Tamam-Nasem-Marros, 1993
 Caloglyphus armatus Mahunka, 1979
 Caloglyphus baloghi Mahunka, 1978
 Caloglyphus berlesei (Michael, 1903)
 Caloglyphus capitatus Mahunka, 1979
 Caloglyphus caroli Channabasavanna & Krishna Rao, in Channabasavanna, Krishna-Rao & Rangnath 1982
 Caloglyphus conus Mahunka, 1978
 Caloglyphus csibbii Eraky, 1999
 Caloglyphus dorylini Mahunka, 1979
 Caloglyphus fimetarius Sevastianov & Tamam-Nasem-Marros, 1993
 Caloglyphus forficularis Sevastianov & Hag H. Rady, in Sevastyanov & Ged-Khamada-Khassan-Kh-Rad 1991
 Caloglyphus fujianensis Zou, Wang & Chang, 1987
 Caloglyphus karnatakaensis Krishna Rao & Ranganath, in Krishna-Rao, Ranganath & Channabasavanna 1982
 Caloglyphus kendae Sevastianov & Tamam-Nasem-Marros, 1993
 Caloglyphus kunshanensis Zou-Ping & Wang-Xiaoz, 1991
 Caloglyphus lamermanni (Berlese, 1923)
 Caloglyphus mandzhur Zakhvatkin
 Caloglyphus moniezi Zakhvatkin 
 Caloglyphus muscarius Sevastianov & Gad H. Rady, in Sevastyanov & Ged-Khamada-Khassan-Kh-Rad 1991
 Caloglyphus mycophagus (Mégnin)
 Caloglyphus pergandis (Berlese, 1920)
 Caloglyphus phyllagnathae Chinniah & Mohanasundaram, 1996
 Caloglyphus radyi Sevastianov & Gad H. Rady, in Sevastyanov & Ged-Khamada-Khassan-Kh-Rad 1991
 Caloglyphus rodriguezi Samsinak, 1980
 Caloglyphus sphaerogaster Zakhvatkin, 1937
 Caloglyphus striatus Klimov, 1996
 Caloglyphus subalaris Sevastianov & Tamam-Nasem-Marros, 1993
 Caloglyphus vitzthumi Mahunka, 1979

References

Acaridae